The 1967–68 Midland Football League season was the 68th in the history of the Midland Football League, a football competition in England.

Clubs
The league featured 21 clubs which competed in the previous season, no new clubs joined the division this season.

League table

References

External links

M
Midland Football League (1889)